Mourad Sadegh Amara (born 19 February 1959) is a retired Algerian international football goalkeeper. He represented Algeria in several tournaments those being the 1980 Summer Olympics,
1982 FIFA World Cup, 1986 FIFA World Cup, and the 1991 Afro-Asian Cup of Nations.

References

1959 births
Living people
Footballers from Tizi Ouzou
Algerian footballers
Algeria international footballers
1982 FIFA World Cup players
1986 FIFA World Cup players
1982 African Cup of Nations players
Olympic footballers of Algeria
Footballers at the 1980 Summer Olympics
JS Kabylie players
Association football goalkeepers
21st-century Algerian people